(Main list of acronyms)


 d – (s) Deci
 D – (s) Deuterium

DA
 da – (s) Danish language (ISO 639-1 code) – deca
 DA –  (s) Denmark (FIPS 10-4 country code) – (i) Debtors Anonymous – (i) U.S. Department of the Army – District Attorney
 DAB – Digital Audio Broadcasting
 DACT – (i) Data Automated Communications Terminal – Dissimilar Air Combat Training
 DADVSI – (i) Loi sur le droit d’auteur et les droits voisins dans la société de l’information (French, "Law on copyrights and related rights in the information society")
 DAES – (i) Defence Acquisition Executive Summary – (UK MoD) Directorate of Analysis, Experimentation and Simulation
 DAF – (a) Dissolved Air Flotation, a technique used in water treatment
 DAFIF – (a) Digital Aeronautical Flight Information File
 DAK – (a) Disney's Animal Kingdom
 DA&M – (i) (U.S.) Director, Administration & Management
 dan – (s) Danish language (ISO 639-2 code)
 DAO – (i) Division Ammunition Officer
 DAQ – (p) Data acquisition – (i) Delivered Audio Quality
 DARE – (a) Drug Abuse Resistance Education
 DARO – (i/a) (U.S.) Defense Airborne Reconnaissance Office
 DARPA – (a) U.S. Defense Advanced Research Projects Agency
 DART – (a) Disaster Assistance Response Team – Dublin Area Rapid Transit
 DAS – (a) Defensive Aids Suite
 DASD – (i) (U.S.) Deputy Assistant Secretary of Defense
 DASL – (i) Datapoint's Advanced Systems Language
 DAU – (i) (U.S.) Defense Acquisition University
 DAWN – (a) (U.S.) Drug Abuse Warning Network

DB
 dB – (s) Decibel
 Db – (s) Dubnium
 DB – (i) Database – Deutsche Bahn
 d/b/a – (i) doing business as
 DBA – (i) De Bellis Antiquitatis (miniature wargaming rules)
 DBBL – (i) (U.S. Army Simulation Center) Dismounted Battlespace Battle Laboratory
 DBCS – (i) Double Byte Character Set
 DBDO – (i) Desert BDO
 DBE – (i) Dame Commander of the Order of the British Empire
 DBF – (i) Detection By Fire (weapon launch signature)
 DBM – (i) De Bellis Multitudinis (miniature wargaming rules) – Detection By Movement (military target)
 DBR – (i) De Bellis Renationis (miniature wargaming rules)
 DBRA – (i) Davis-Bacon Related Acts
 DBS – (i) Direct Broadcast Services (television)
 Disclosure and Barring Service (UK)

DC
 DC
 (i) da capo
 Italian Democrazia Cristiana
 Digital Compass
 Direct Current
 (s) District of Columbia (postal symbol)
 (i) Douglas Aircraft Company
 Dublin Core
 Duty Cycle
Disconnected
 DCA
 (i) Defensive Counter Air
 Drum Corps Associates
 (p) DiChloroAcetate
 (s) Ronald Reagan Washington National Airport (IATA code)
 DCAA – (i) (U.S.) Defense Contract Audit Agency
 DCAS – (i) Devon and Cornwall Archery Society
 DCC
 (i) Dallas Christian College
 Digital Command Control (model railroading)
 Direct Client-to-Client (Internet Relay Chat)
 Dismounted Close Combat
 DCCP – (i) Datagram Congestion Control Protocol
 DCD – (i) [Organ] Donation after Cardiac Death
 DCDC – Development, Concepts and Doctrine Centre
 DCE – (i) Data Communication Equipment
 DCFC – (i) Death Cab for Cutie
 DCI
 (i) Detection, Classification and Identification
 Drum Corps International
 Duellists' Convocation International, now known simply by the initials
 DCIM – (p) Digital Camera Images
 DCIMS
 (i) Dental Classification Information Management System
 Dismounted Combat Identification Marking System
 DCL – Disney Cruise Line
 DCN – Deacon
 DCOM – Disney Channel Original Movie
 DCOP – (i) Desktop Communication Protocol
 DCSOPS – (p) Deputy Chief of Staff for Operations and plans
 DCW – (i) Digital Chart of the World
 DCYSC – (i) Discovery Channel Young Scientist Challenge

DD
 DD – many, including due diligence and dear daughter (increasingly prevalent on social mailing lists, blogs, and bulletin boards); see entry - Dunkin Donuts
 D&D
 (i) Dungeons and Dragons
 Diversion and Distress (Air Traffic Control)
 DDA
 (i) Digital Differential Analyzer (graphics algorithm)
 Digital Differential Analyzer
 Deputy District Attorney
 DDD
 (i) Data Display Debugger
 Digital Digital Digital (CD mastering)
 DDL – (i) Digital Data Link
 DDLC - Doki Doki Literature Club!
 DDLC+ - the expanded version, Doki Doki Literature Club Plus!
 DDN – (i) U.S. Defense Data Network
 DDoS – (i) Distributed Denial of Service
 DDP
 (i) Danish Design Prize
 Deutsche Demokratische Partei (German, "German Democratic Party" – former political party in Weimar Germany)
 Diamond Dallas Page (American professional wrestler)
 DDR
 (i) Dance Dance Revolution
 Deutsche Demokratische Republik (German, "German Democratic Republic" (GDR), East Germany)
 Double Data Rate
 (s) East Germany (ISO 3166 trigram, obsolete since 1990)
 DDR&E – (i) (U.S.) Defense Department Research and Engineering
 DDS – (i) Doctor of Dental Surgery
 DDT
 (i) Dichloro-Diphenyl-Trichloroethane (insecticide)
 Dramatic Dream Team, the original name of the Japanese professional wrestling promotion DDT Pro-Wrestling
 Dynamic Debugging Tool (computing)

DE
 de – (s) German language (ISO 639-1 code)
 DE – (s) Delaware (postal symbol) – Germany (ISO 3166 digram)
 DEA – (i) Drug Enforcement Administration
 DEA – (i) Drug Enforcement Agency
 DEC
 (a/i) Department of Environmental Conservation
 Digital Equipment Corporation
 Disasters Emergency Committee
 DeCA – (p) (U.S.) Defense Commissary Agency
 DECSIM – (p) Model DEComposition and SIMulation algorithm – Directed Energy Combat SIMulation
 DECT – (a) Digital European Cordless Telephone
 DEERS – (a) Defense Enrollment Eligibility Reporting System (US Department of Defense database of individuals eligible for certain benefits)
 DEFCON – (p) Defence readiness condition
 DEFRA – (a) (UK) Department for Environment, Food and Rural Affairs
 DELT – (a) Dual Ended Line Test (ing)
 DEM
 (i) Data Exchange Mechanism
 Digital Elevation Model
 DEN – (s) Denmark (IOC and FIFA trigram, but not ISO 3166)
 DEPSECDEF – (p) (U.S.) Deputy Secretary of Defense
 DERA – (a) British Defence Evaluation and Research Agency (1995–2001)
 DES – (i) Deep Ecliptic Survey
 deu – (s) German language (ISO 639-2 code)
 DEU – (s) Germany (ISO 3166 trigram)

DF
 DF
 (i) Direct Fire
 Direction Finding
 Distrito Federal (Spanish and Portuguese for "federal district")
 DFAD – (p) Digital Feature Analysis Data ("dee-fad")
 DFAS – (i) (U.S.) Defense Finance and Accounting Service
 DFB – (i) Deutscher Fußball-Bund (German for "German Football Association")
 DFCB – (i) Data Format Control Book
 DfID – (i) UK Department for International Development
 DFL
 (i) Democratic–Farmer–Labor (the full designation of the Minnesota affiliate of the U.S. Democratic Party)
 Deutsche Fußball Liga (German for "German Football League"), the operator of the top two leagues of German football
 DFM – (i) Dynamic Flowgraph Methodology
 DFM – (ii) Discrete Field Model see Superluminal motion
 DFSP – (i) Dermatofibrosarcoma protuberans
 DfT– (i) Department for Transport
 DFTBA – (i) Don't Forget To Be Awesome- a term commonly used by the Vlogbrothers

DG
 DG – (i) Dei gratia (Latin, "by the grace of God") – Director-General – Data General
 DGA – (i) Direction générale des armées (French "Armed Forces General Directorate")
 DGAF – (I) Don't give a f***
 DGD&D – (i) UK Directorate General of Development and Doctrine
 DGPS – (i) Differential GPS
 DGZ – (i) Desired Ground Zero

DH
 DH – (i) dear husband (increasingly prevalent on social mailing lists, blogs, and bulletin boards) – Designated hitter
 DHA – (p) DocosaHexaenoic Acid
 DHHS – (i) (U.S.) Department of Health and Human Services
 DHL – (i) Dalsey, Hillblom, and Lynn (courier service)
 DHRA – (i) (U.S.) DoD Human Resources Activity
 DHS – (i) U.S. Department of Homeland Security
 DHSS – (i) UK Department of Health and Social Security
 DHTFYSS – (i) U.S. Don't Have Time For You Silly S****
 DHY – (s) Dahomey (ISO 3166 trigram; became BEN for Benin in 1977)

DI
 DIA – (i) U.S. Defense Intelligence Agency
 DIAC –  (a) Department of Immigration and Citizenship (Australia) 
 DiC –  Design Island Centre (computing usually used in a teaching situation)
 DICASS – (p) DIrectional Command Activated Sonobuoy System
 DID – (i) Dissociative identity disorder
 DILLIGAD – (a) Do I Look Like I Give A Damn? (military shorthand, slightly less offensive than the following) 
 DILLIGAF – (a) Do I Look Like I Give A Fuck? (military shorthand; the theme of biography, album, tour, and other products of Kevin Bloody Wilson) 
 DIF – (i) Data Interchange Format
 DIFAR – (p) DIrectional Frequency Analysis and Recording
 DIME – (a) Dense inert metal explosive
 DIMM – (a) Dual In-line Memory Module (computing)
 DIN
 (i) Deutsches Institut für Normung (German, "German Institute for Standardization")
 Drug Identification Number (Canadian drug marketing requirement)
 DINA
 (p/a) Diesel Nacional (Spanish, "National Diesel"—Mexican bus and truck manufacturer now known as DINA)
 Dirección de Inteligencia Nacional (Spanish, "National Intelligence Directorate"—former secret police of Chile)
 DINKY – (a) Double Income, No Kids Yet
 DIP – (a) Dual In-line Package (electronics)
 DIPS – (a) Defense independent pitching statistics
 DIR – (i) Defence Industrial Research
 DIS
 (i) Defence Intelligence Staff
 (U.S.) Defense Investigative Service
 Distributed Interactive Simulation
 Draft International Standard (ISO)
 DISA
 (a) U.S. Defense Information Systems Agency
 Distinguished Individual Service Award
 DISCOM – (p) Division Support Command
 DISE – (i) Deployable Intelligence Support Element
 DISSTAF – (a) DIS Search and Target Acquisition Fidelity experiment
 DITY – (i/a) Do-It-Yourself
 div – (s) Dhivehi language (ISO 639-2 code)
 DIVAD – (p) Division Air Defence
 DIY – (i) Do It Yourself

DJ
 DJ – (i) Disc Jockey – Dinner Jacket – (s) Djibouti (ISO 3166 digram; FIPS 10-4 country code)
 DJD – (i) Degenerative Joint Disease – Dublin Julian Day – Discoveries in the Judaean Desert DJF – (s) Djibouti franc (ISO 4217 currency code)
 DJI – (s) Djibouti (ISO 3166 trigram)
 DJS – (i) Director, Joint Staff

DK
 DK – (s) Denmark (ISO 3166 digram) - Donna Karan
 DKK – (s) Danish krone (ISO 4217 currency code)
 DKP - Don King Productions

DL
 DL – Dexter's Laboratory DLA
 (i) U.S. Defense Logistics Agency
 Dental Laboratories Association
 DLIC – (i) Detachment Left-In-Contact
 DLIR – (i) Depot-Level Inspection and Repair
 DLL – (i) Dynamic Link Library
 DLPFC or DL-PFC – (i) DorsoLateral PreFrontal Cortex
 DLPMC – (i) DorsoLateral PreMotor Cortex
 DLR
 (i) Deutsches Zentrum für Luft- und Raumfahrt (German, German Aerospace Centre)
 Docklands Light Railway
 DLRP – (i) Data Link Reference Point
 DLS – (i) Deep Lens Survey
 DLSA – (i) (U.S.) Defense Legal Services Agency
 DLSc – (p) Diploma in Library Science
 DLSC
 (i) U.S. Defense Logistics Services Center
 U.S. Defense Logistics Support Command
 Department of Library Special Collections (Western Kentucky University Libraries)
 Direct Loan Servicing Center
 Directorate of Land Strategic Concepts (Canada)
 Dominican Lay Scholars Community
DLTBGYD – Don't let the bastards grind you down

DM
 DM
 (s) Dominica (ISO 3166 digram)
 (i) Dungeon Master (role-playing games)
 DMA
 (i) Designated market area (primarily a U.S. term)
 U.S. Defense Mapping Agency (became NIMA, then NGA)
 Direct Memory Access (computing)
 (s) Dominica (ISO 3166 trigram)
 DMC – (i) (U.S.) Defense Management Council
 DMCA – Digital Millennium Copyright Act
 DMD
 (i) dentariae medicinae doctor (Latin, "doctor of dental medicine")
 Digital Micromirror Device
 Digital Multilayer Disk
 DMI – (i) Desktop Management Interface (computing)
 DMM – Digital Multimeter
 DMOC – (i) Distributed Mission Operations Centre
 DMOS – (i/a) Double Diffused MOS transistor ("dee-moss")
 DMPA – (i) (U.S.) Defense Medical Programs Activity
 DMPFC – (i) DorsoMedial PreFrontal Cortex
 DMPK – (i) Drug Metabolism and Pharmacokinetics
 DMRB – (i) Design Manual for Roads and Bridges
 DMS – (i) U.S. Defense Message System
 DMSO
 (p) Dimethyl sulfoxide
 (i) U.S. Defense Modeling & Simulation Office ("dim-so"), now Modeling and Simulation Coordination Office
 DMSP – (i) U.S. Defense Meteorological Satellite Program
 DMT – (i) Dimethyltryptamine
 DMU – (i) Diesel Multiple Unit, a method of connecting self-propelled railway vehicles together to form a train under the control of one driver.
 DMV – (i) Department of Motor Vehicles
 DMZ – (i) DeMilitarized Zone

DN
 DN – (i) Deacon
 DNA
 (i) U.S. Defense Nuclear Agency
 Deoxyribonucleic acid
 Douglas Noël Adams
 DNAW – (i) Day Night All Weather
 DND – (i) Department of National Defence (Canada) – Do not disturb
 DNDi – (i) Drugs for Neglected Diseases initiative
 DNDO – (i) U.S. Domestic Nuclear Detection Office
 DNM – (i) Defence Nuclear Material
 DNK – (s) Denmark (ISO 3166 trigram)
 DNR – (i) Do not resuscitate
DNS – (i) Domain name system

DO
 DO – (s) Dominica (FIPS 10-4 country code) – Dominican Republic (ISO 3166 digram) – (i) Doctor of Osteopathic Medicine
 DOA – (i) Dead On Arrival – Dead or Alive
 DOB – (i) Date Of Birth
DoCRA – (a) Duty of Care Risk Analysis Standard
 DOD – (i) U.S. Department of Defense
 DODAF – (a) U.S. Department of Defense Architectural Framework
 DoDD – (i) U.S. Department of Defense Directive
 DoDEA – (i) (U.S.) Department of Defense Education Activity
 DOE – (i/a) U.S. Department of Energy
 DOHC – (i) Dual-OverHead-Cam engine
 DOI – (i) Digital Object Identifier – U.S. Department of the Interior
 DOM – (i) Deo optimo maximo (Latin, "to God, the best and greatest") – (a) Document Object Model – (s) Dominican Republic (ISO 3166 trigram)
 DOMS – (i) (U.S.) Director of Military Support
 DOP – (s) Dominican peso (ISO 4217 currency code)
 DORA – (a) Defence of the Realm Act
 DOS – (a) Denial of Service (DoS, cf. DDoS) – Density of State – Disk Operating System
 DOT – (i) Department of Transportation (U.S. federal or state) – Damage Over Time (common in World of Warcraft)
 DOTA – short-form for DEFENSE OF THE ANCIENTS a popular online epic game
 DotD – (i) Deal of the Day (marketing gimmick)
 DOTMLPF – (i) Doctrine, Organization, Training, Materiel, Leadership, Personnel, and Facilities (mnemonic)
 DOW – (i) Died of Wounds

DP
 DP – (i) Division de production (Algerian petroleum company)
 DP – (i) Decision Point – Dynamic Programming
 DPA – (i) UK Defence Procurement Agency
 DPCO – (i) Double-Pole Change Over
 DPDT – (i) Double-Pole Double-Throw
 DPICM – (i) Dual-Purpose Improved Conventional Munition
 DPKO – (p) UN Department for Peacekeeping Operations
 DPMO – (i) (U.S.) Defense Prisoner of War/Missing Personnel Office
 DPPDB – (p) Digital Point Positioning Database
 DPRE – (p) Displaced Person or Refugee (plural Displaced Persons and Refugees) (originally Displaced Persons, Refugees, Evacuees)
 DPRK – (i) Democratic People's Republic of Korea
 DPST – (i) Double-Pole Single-Throw

DQ
 DQ
 (i) Dairy Queen
 (s) Jarvis Island (FIPS 10-4 country code)

DR
 DR – (i) Dead Reckoning – (s) Dominican Republic (FIPS 10-4 country code) – (i) Danmarks Radio (Danish Broadcasting Corporation)
 DRA – (i) Defence Research Agency (UK, 1991–1995) – Democratic Republic of America
 DRAGN – (a) Double Radio source Active Galactic Nucleus ("dragon")
 DRAM – (a) Dynamic Random Access Memory ("dee-ram") (computing)
 DRC – (i) Democratic Republic of the Congo -- Domaine Romanee Conti
 DRDC – (i) Defence Research & Development Canada
 DREA – (i/a) Defence Research Establishment Atlantic (obsolete 2002)
 DRES – (i/a) Defence Research Establishment Suffield (obsolete 2002)
 DRET – (i/a) Defence Research Establishment Toronto (obsolete 2002)
 DREV – (i/a) Defence Research Establishment Valcartier (obsolete 2002)
 DRI – (i) Detection, Recognition, Identification – Dietary Reference Intake
 DRIC – (i/a) (U.S.) Defense Research Information Center
 DRL – (i) Daytime Running Lights – Dorman Roberts Ltd.
 DRM – (i) Digital Rights Management
 DRMS – (i) (U.S.) Defense Revitalization and Marketing Service
 DRPR – (p) Drawing Practices
 DRT – (i) Document Related Technologies

DS
 Ds – (s) Darmstadtium
 DS
 (i) Dear son (increasingly prevalent on social mailing lists, blogs, and bulletin boards)
 Defence Scientist
 Direct Support
 (s) Dust Storm (METAR Code)
 DSA
 (i) (U.S.) Defense Support Activities
 Division Support Area
 DSAA
 (i) (U.S.) Defense Security Assistance Agency
Driving Schools Association of the Americas
 DECT Standard Authentication Algorithm
 DSAS – (i) Disney Sing Along Songs DSB – (i) (U.S.) Defense Science Board
 DSC
 (i) Differential Scanning Calorimeter
 Digital Selective Calling
 Digital Still Camera
 Distinguished Service Cross
 Doctor of Surgical Chiropody (obsolete)
 Document structure convention (PostScript programming)
 Dynamic Stability Control
 DSCS – (i) U.S. Defense Satellite Communications System
 DSCSOC – (i) DSCS Operations Center
 DSD – (i) Defence Studies Department (King's College, London)
 DSDS – (i) Deutschland sucht den Superstar (German, "Germany Seeks the Superstar"), the German version of the Idol series
 DSE  – (i) Dry Sheep Equivalent
 DSG – (i) Direct-Shift Gearbox
 DSID – (i) Dismounted Soldier Identification System
 DSL – (i) Digital Subscriber Line
 DSLR – (i) Digital single-lens reflex (camera)
 DSM – (i) Diagnostic and Statistical Manual of Mental Disorders
 DSN – (i) Deep Space Network
 DSO – (i) Distinguished Service Order (British military decoration)
 dsp – (i) decessit sine prole (Latin, "died without issue") – genealogy short-hand
 dspl – (i) decessit sine prole legitima (Latin, "died without legitimate issue")
 dspm – (i) decessit sine prole mascula [superstite] (Latin, "died without surviving male issue" )
 dspml – (i) decessit sine prole mascula legitima (Latin, "died without legitimate male issue")
 dspms – (i) decessit sine prole mascula superstite (Latin, "died without surviving male issue") 
 dsps – (i) Decessit sine prole superstite (Latin, "died without surviving issue")
 DSP
 (i) Defense Standardization Program
 Defense Support Program
 Digital signal processing
 DSPL – (i) Design Specialists and Plans Language
 DSR – (i) Deformed Special Relativity
 DSRV
 (i) Deaf Sports Recreation Victoria
 Deep Submergence Rescue Vehicle
 DSS
 (i) Digitized Sky Survey
 Discarding-Sabot Shell (ammunition)
 DST – (i) Daylight saving time
 DSTL – (i) British Defence Science and Technology Laboratory
 dsvp – d.s.v.p. decessit sine vitae patria (Latin, "died within fathers lifetime")
 DSWA – (i) (U.S.) Defense Special Weapons Agency

DT
 DTA – (i) Dental Technologists Association
 DTaP – (a/p) Diphtheria, tetanus, acellular pertussis (vaccine) (pronounced "D-tap")
 DTD – (i) Digital Terrain Data
 DTE – (i) Data Terminal Equipment – Down To Earth
 DTED – (p) Digital Terrain Elevation Data ("dee-ted")
 DTG – (i) Date-Time Group
 DTH – (i) Direct To Home (television)
 DTI – (i) UK Department of Trade and Industry
 DTIC – (i) (U.S.) Defense Technical Information Center
 DTL – (i) diode–transistor logicc (electronics)
 DTM
 (i) Deutsche Tourenwagen Masters (German, "German Touring Car Masters" – a current motor racing series)
 Deutsche Tourenwagen Meisterschaft (German, "German Touring Car Championship" – a defunct motor racing series)
 DTMF – (i) Dual-tone multi-frequency signaling
 DTLOMS – (i) Doctrine, Training, Leader development, Organization, Materiel, and Soldier (mnemonic)
 DTO – (i) Disruptive Technology Office (was ARDA)
 DTOMLS – (i) Doctrine, Training, Organization, Materiel, Leader and Soldier development (mnemonic)
 DTP
 (i) Desktop publishing
 Desktop Tablet Press source
 Diphtheria, tetanus, pertussis (vaccine)
 DTR – (i) Determine The Relationship
 DTRA – (i) Defense Threat Reduction Agency ("deet-ra")
 DTSA – (i) (U.S.) Defense Technology Security Administration (ii) Defend Trade Secrets Act

DU
 DU
 (i) Depleted Uranium
 (s) Dust (METAR Code)
 DUI
 (i) Data Use Identifier
 Data Use Institute
 Davis Unified Ignition
 Diving Unlimited International
 Documento Único de Identidad
 Documento Unico de Importación
 Driving Under the Influence
 Duke University Improv
 DUMBO – (a) Down Under the Manhattan Bridge Overpass (Brooklyn neighborhood)
 DUSD – (i) (U.S.) Deputy Under-Secretary of Defense

DV
 dv – (s) Dhivehi language (ISO 639-1 code)
 DV
 (i) Daily Value (FDA food guide)
 Deo volente (Latin, "God willing")
 DVD – (i) Digital Versatile Disk (was Digital Video Disk)
 DVLC – (i) UK Driver and Vehicle Licensing Centre
 dvm – (i) decessit vita matris (Latin, "died in the lifetime of the mother")
 DVM – (i) Doctor of Veterinary Medicine
 DVO – (i) Direct View Optics
 DVOM – Digital Volt-Ohm Meter
 DVP – various meanings (disambiguation page)
 dvp – (i) decessit vita patris (Latin, "died in the lifetime of the father")
 DVT
 (i) Deep vein thrombosis
 Design verification test
 Driving Van Trailer (rail vehicle)
 dvu – (i) decessit vita uxoris'' (Latin, "died in the lifetime of spouse")

DW
 DW – (a) Drum Workshop
 DWG – (p) Divisional Wargame (military simulation)
 DWI – (i) Dance With Intensity – Danish West Indies – Diffusion-weighted imaging –  Direct water injection – Disaster Welfare Inquiry – Drinking Water Inspectorate – Driving While Intoxicated/Impaired
 DWM – (a) Doctor Who Magazine
 DWIM – (a) Do What I Mean
 DWTS – (a) Dancing with the Stars
 DWW – (a) Down with Webster

DX
 DX
 (s) Dexterity (role-playing games)
 (p) DeXtrorphan
 Distant (radio)
 (i) D-Generation X (professional wrestling stable)
 DXA – (i) Dual-energy X-ray Absorptiometry
 DXM – (p) DeXtroMethorphan

DY
 Dy – (s) Dysprosium
 DY – (s) Dahomey (ISO 3166 digram; obsolete since 1977)

DZ
 dz – (s) Dzongkha language (ISO 639-1 code)
 DZ – (s) Algeria (ISO 3166 digram) – Drizzle (METAR Code) – (i) Drop Zone
 DZA – (s) Algeria (ISO 3166 trigram)
 DZD – (s) Algerian dinar (ISO 4217 currency code)
 dzo – (s) Dzongkha language (ISO 639-2 code)
 DZO (Depleted Zinc Oxide — physics/chemistry jargon)

Acronyms D